Bon Air is a historic home located at Fallston, Harford County, Maryland. It is a three-story dwelling of stone, stuccoed and scored in imitation of ashlar, with a steep hipped roof featuring a pronounced splay or "kick" at the eaves.  It was built in 1794 by Francois de la Porte, who brought his own joiners, blacksmiths, masons, and artisans with him to recreate an exact replica of a rural seat in Northern France. It is one of the few structures in Harford County with a distinct French heritage.

It was listed on the National Register of Historic Places in 1977.

References

External links
, including undated photo, Maryland Historical Trust website

French-American culture in Maryland
Houses on the National Register of Historic Places in Maryland
Houses in Harford County, Maryland
Houses completed in 1794
Historic American Buildings Survey in Maryland
Fallston, Maryland
National Register of Historic Places in Harford County, Maryland
1794 establishments in Maryland